Sarah Stirk is a British television presenter currently appearing on Sky Sports Golf.  Stirk sold her luxury agency Xclusive Golf to Golfbreaks.com and continues to work for them as an ambassador.

Broadcasting career
Stirk began her broadcasting career on MUTV, the channel for prominent football team Manchester United. She has also presented on BBC's East Midlands Today.

She spent two years covering the PGA Golf Tour on the now defunct Setanta Golf. After Setanta's demise in 2009 she started presenting sports news for the BBC, appearing on the BBC News Channel in the UK and BBC World News, including Sports Today. She works for Sky News.

Stirk has also reported on the Open Championship on radio for TalkSport and in 2010 was part of the team on Radio 5 Live's coverage of the PGA Championship and Scottish Open.

Writing
Stirk contributes to several golfing publications, including Golf International and A Place in the Sun.

Business career
Stirk sold her luxury agency to Golfbreaks.com in an acquisition deal completed in April 2016.

Personal life 
In 2021, Stirk came out as a lesbian.

References

External links
Sarahstirk.com

British sports broadcasters
BBC World News
Living people
Year of birth missing (living people)
British LGBT journalists